EN 15838 is a European standard describing the requirements for service provision for Customer Contact Centres. It was approved by CEN (European Committee for Standardization) on October 5, 2009. The standard is implemented in several countries in Europe via their own national organizations.

Standard
The standard includes areas such as:
 Management strategy and policy
 Processes
 Requirements for Contact Centre agents
 Requirements for Infrastructure
 Customer satisfaction
 Social responsibility
 Mandatory KPIs
 Recommended KPIs
 Best practice guidelines for client organizations

Notes

See also
List of EN standards

External links
Official Site: European Committee for Standardization
Non-official resource site: en15838.org
 
15838